Georgia's 3rd congressional district is a congressional district in the U.S. state of Georgia. The district is currently represented by Republican Drew Ferguson.  The district's boundaries have been redrawn following the 2010 census, which granted an additional congressional seat to Georgia. The first election using the new district boundaries (listed below) were the 2012 congressional elections.

The district is based in west-central Georgia. It includes most of the southern suburbs of Atlanta–where most of its population is located–as well as the wealthier (and more demographically Caucasian) portions of Columbus and its northern suburbs.

Counties
 Carroll County 
 Coweta County
 Fayette County (Partial, see also )
 Harris County
 Heard County
 Henry County (Partial, see also  and )
 Lamar County
 Meriwether County
 Muscogee County (Partial, see also )
 Pike County
 Spalding County
 Troup County
 Upson County

Recent results in presidential elections

List of members representing the district

Election results

2006

2008

2010

2012

2014

2016

2018

2020

2022

See also
Georgia's congressional districts
List of United States congressional districts

References

 Congressional Biographical Directory of the United States 1774–present

External links
 PDF map of Georgia's 3rd district at nationalatlas.gov
 Georgia's 3rd district at GovTrack.us

03